Thaumatopsis fernaldella is a moth in the family Crambidae. It was described by William D. Kearfott in 1905. It is found in North America, where it has been recorded from Alberta, California, Florida, Maryland, Mississippi, Nevada, New Mexico, Oklahoma, Saskatchewan and Texas. The habitat consists of prairies.

The wingspan is 23–31 mm. Adults are on wing from April to October.

References

Crambini
Moths described in 1905
Moths of North America